The butt is an obsolete English measure of liquid volume equalling two hogsheads, being between  by various definitions.

Equivalents

The butt is one in a series of English wine cask units, being half of a tun.

See also
 English wine cask units § Pipe or butt

References

Units of volume